Mary McLendon may refer to:
 Mary Latimer McLendon, activist in the prohibition and women's suffrage movements
 Mary Stone McLendon, Native American musician, storyteller, humanitarian, and educator